Frank Denby was a British gymnast. He competed in the men's team event at the 1908 Summer Olympics.

References

External links
 

Year of birth missing
Year of death missing
British male artistic gymnasts
Olympic gymnasts of Great Britain
Gymnasts at the 1908 Summer Olympics
Place of birth missing